The Assumpta Cathedral  also called Owerri Cathedral Is the name given to a religious building belonging to the Catholic Church which is located in the city of Owerri, the capital of the state of Imo in the southeastern part of the African country of Nigeria. As its name indicates, it is dedicated to the Catholic dogma of The Assumption of the Virgin Mary.

The temple follows the Roman or Latin rite and is the main church of the Metropolitan Archdiocese of Owerri (Archidioecesis Overriensis) which began as an apostolic vicariate in 1948 and obtained its current status in 1994 through the bull "Ad aptius efficaciusque" by then Pope John Paul II.

It is under the pastoral responsibility of Archbishop Anthony John Valentine Obinna.

History
Construction of the cathedral began in 1954 and was dedicated in 1980. The plan to build a modern cathedral in Owerri was led by the diocese and its Irish Bishop, Joseph Brendan Whelan. Funds were sourced from church members and from abroad, in particular, Rome. An Irish priest, Rev. Christopher King who was also an architect supervised the construction of the structure right before the Civil War. The site chosen for the cathedral was at the outskirts of Owerri near an inter-state road junction that links Owerri to Port Harcourt, Onitsha, and Aba. The commencement of the Nigerian Civil War impeded construction from 1967 to 1970. Before the war, construction had progressed and the main part of the building with the exception of the roof deck and covering was already finished.  During the war, the site of the cathedral came under fire a few times because the dome was thought to be an observation post.

The architectural style of the building is similar to Renaissance ecclesiastical. The structure of the church is designed in the shape of a Greek cross with four naves of equal length spread in opposite directions and between the naves will four chapels. The altar is centrally located and has a dome that reaches 120 feet in height and 101 feet in diameter. The interior floor is made of marble while the material of the structure is reinforced concrete. The capacity of the building is 3,000.

See also
Roman Catholicism in Nigeria
Cathedral of the Holy Cross, Lagos

References

Roman Catholic cathedrals in Nigeria
20th-century Roman Catholic church buildings in Nigeria